Protolithocolletis is a genus of moths in the family Gracillariidae.

Species
Protolithocolletis lathyri Braun, 1929

External links
Global Taxonomic Database of Gracillariidae (Lepidoptera)

Lithocolletinae
Gracillarioidea genera

Taxa named by Annette Frances Braun